Conus guanahacabibensis is a species of sea snail, a marine gastropod mollusc in the family Conidae, the cone snails, cone shells or cones.

This snail is predatory and venomous and is capable of "stinging" humans.

Description

Distribution
This marine species of cone snail occurs off Cuba.

References

 Espinosa J. & Ortea J. (2016). Nueva especie del género Conus Linnaeus, 1758 (Mollusca: Neogastropoda: Conidae) de la península de Guanahacabibes, Pinar del Río, Cuba. Revista de la Academia Canaria de Ciencias. 28: 209-214.

guanahacabibensis
Gastropods described in 2016